Highs in the Mid-Sixties, Volume 23 (subtitled Texas, Part 5) is the final compilation album in the Highs in the Mid-Sixties series, featuring recordings that were released in Texas.  This is one of five volumes in the series that collects songs by Texas bands; the others are Highs in the Mid-Sixties, Volume 11, Highs in the Mid-Sixties, Volume 12, Highs in the Mid-Sixties, Volume 13, and Highs in the Mid-Sixties, Volume 17.

Release data
This album was released in 1986 as an LP by AIP Records (as #AIP-10038).

Notes on the tracks
Gaylon Latimer made a total of four singles in 1965 and 1966; three were in the name of Gaylon Ladd, but one was made with Bob Sharp under the name Bob & Gaylon.  "Repulsive Situation" was not included on any of the four.

Track listing

Side 1

 The Wind: "Don't Take Your Love Away" (L. C. Johnson)
 The Lost Generation: "Let Me Out" (Rhodes/Keating)
 Gaylon Ladd: "Her Loving Way" (Gaylon Latimer) — rel. 1965
 Kenny Wayne & the Kamotions: "A Better Day's a Comin'" (Kenny Wayne Hagler)
 Larry Mack: "Last Day of the Dragon" (Larry Stanley) — rel. 1966
 Wilshire Express: "Lose Your Money (But Don't Lose Your Mind)" (Denny Laine/Mike Pinder)
 Jimmy C. & the Chelsea Five: "Leave Me Alone" (S. Celsur)

Side 2
 The Blox: "Hangin' Out" (R. Turner)
 Gaylon Ladd: "Repulsive Situation" (Gaylon Latimer)
 Sterling Damon: "Rejected" (M. D. Gilmore) — rel. 1966
 The Shayds: "Search the Sun" (S. Bailey)
 The Children: "Enough of What I Need" (B. Ash/Quillian Marechal)
 Sweet Smoke: "Morning Dew" (T. Rose/B. Dobson) — rel. 1968

Pebbles (series) albums
1986 compilation albums
Music of Texas